"Press F to pay respects" or "Press X to pay respects" is an Internet meme that originated from Call of Duty: Advanced Warfare, a 2014 first-person shooter in Activision's Call of Duty franchise. It originated as a set of instructions conveyed during an in-game quick time event at a funeral service. Widely mocked by critics and players due to its forced element of interactivity that was not perceived to be tastefully executed, the phrase would later become a notable Internet meme in its own right. It is sometimes used by Internet commenters to convey solidarity and sympathy, either sarcastic or sincere, in response to unfortunate events.

Origin
The exact prompt "Press  to Pay Respects" ("Hold  to Pay Respects" in Xbox versions and "Hold  to Pay Respects" in PlayStation versions) appears as a prompt during a playable segment where the player character, U.S. Marine Corps Private First Class Jackson "Jack" Mitchell, mourns the death of his comrade, Private William "Will" Irons, during the latter's memorial service after he is killed saving Mitchell's life in battle. Upon performing the action, Mitchell steps forward and places his right hand on Irons' coffin for approximately six seconds, before turning around to leave.

Per an interview Advanced Warfare screenwriter John MacInnes conducted by theScore eSports, the prompt was "a byproduct of late-stage game development" that MacInnes did not have control over, and that he did not know it was in the game until a journalist asked him about it.

The same prompt had appeared previously in the 2011 video game Batman: Arkham City, in a section where Batman can visit the alley where his parents, Thomas and Martha Wayne, were murdered, the prompt appearing if the player chooses to approach the chalk outlines of their bodies. Andrew Vestal of Gamasutra noted the difference between the two games was that in Arkham City, the prompt was optional, and that "Ultimately, it doesn’t matter if the player decides to pay their respects or to keep on walking. The point has been made."

Reception
Upon the release of Advanced Warfare in November 2014, many critics and players mocked the cutscene for its forced or awkward element of interactivity that seemed out of place at a memorial service. The mechanic was frequently criticized and ridiculed for both being arbitrary and unnecessary, as well as being inappropriate to the mournful tone of the funeral the game otherwise intended to convey.

In 2014, late night show celebrity Conan O'Brien reviewed Advanced Warfare on a "Clueless Gamer" episode and criticized most of the gameplay of Advanced Warfare, particularly the "Hold X to Pay Respects" scene. On the other hand, Paste described the mourning process, which takes the form of a quick time event, as terrifically funny with the potential to catch on as a viral meme.

Spread 
The phrase has since become detached from its source, sometimes used in a sincere and unironic manner. In the years after the release of Advanced Warfare, users began typing a singular "F" in chat windows on websites such as Twitch to convey condolences or a sense of sorrow when reacting to any unfortunate news on the Internet, leading streamers and others to refer to this with the phrase "F in the chat". A notable example of "F in the chat" was in the tribute stream for the Jacksonville Landing shooting, where some viewers responded to the proceedings by posting a single letter "F" in the chat.

Legacy
In retrospect, Morgan Park of PC Gamer described the meme as Call of Duty greatest legacy. Vitor Braz of GameRevolution described it as one of the most popular video game memes of all time. Cecilia D'Anastasio of Kotaku referred to the meme as iconic, and further stated that it's not because it's "uniquely stupid", but because "the balance between 'sad' and 'flippant' is so hilariously lopsided". Ky Shinkle of Screen Rant described it as a video gaming meme that never gets old, and stated that it's common among gamers when "F" appears in unfortunate news or circumstances.

References

Further reading

External links
 

2010s slang
Call of Duty
Internet memes introduced in the 2010s
Internet memes introduced in 2014
Internet slang
2014 neologisms
Video game memes
Quotations from video games
Fiction about funerals